Steve Wilcock (born 24 January 1954) is a former speedway rider from England.

Speedway career 
Wilcock rode in the top two tiers of British Speedway from 1974 to 1991, riding for various clubs. In 1979, he finished runner-up in the National League Riders' Championship. He was regarded as one of the leading National League riders at the time, consistently finishing in the top ten averages.

References 

Living people
1954 births
British speedway riders
Coventry Bees riders
Halifax Dukes riders
Middlesbrough Bears riders
Rye House Rockets riders
Belle Vue Aces riders
Birmingham Brummies riders